"We Don't Want the Bacon (What We Want Is a Piece of the Rhine)" is a World War I–era song released in 1918. The lyrics were written by "Kid" Howard Carr and Harry Russell, and the music composed by Jimmie Havens. The song was published by Shapiro, Bernstein & Co. of New York City. On the cover is a soldier tearing through a large piece of bacon with his bayonet. A fearful-looking Kaiser Wilhelm II is standing on the bacon. It was written for voice and piano.

The song was recorded on September 9, 1918 by the Peerless Quartet. They were conducted by Josef Pasternack. Victor Records issued the song.

The song's title is influenced by the popular saying, "bring home the bacon". This phrase means to be successful, specifically financially successful. In the song, it is emphasized that Americans have thrived in holding their own against any enemy and always "brought home the bacon, no matter what". This time though, their focus is not on bacon, but getting the "Hun". It is apparent in the lyrics that the fear of Germany is downplayed. The chorus is as follows:

References

Bibliography

External links
Sheet music at University of Illinois Urbana-Champaign Digital Collections
Sheet music at University of Florida Digital Collections
Sheet music and song MP3 at the Illinois Digital Archive

1918 songs
Songs about Germany
Songs of World War I
Victor Talking Machine Company singles